The No Net Cost Tobacco Act of 1982 (P.L. 97-218) required that the Tobacco Price Support Program operate at no net cost to taxpayers, other than for the administrative expenses common to all price support programs. To satisfy this mandate, sellers and buyers (including importers) of tobacco were assessed equally to build a capital account that was drawn upon to reimburse the Commodity Credit Corporation (CCC) for any losses of principal and interest resulting from nonrecourse loan operations. Other provisions of this law provided for reducing the level of support for tobacco and made various modifications to the marketing quota and acreage allotment programs. No net cost assessments ended when price support was terminated after the 2004 crop.

External links
 
 

1982 in law
97th United States Congress
Tobacco in the United States
United States federal agriculture legislation